Vladyslav Andriyovych Pryimak (born 30 August 1996 in Simferopol, AR Crimea, Ukraine) is a Ukrainian football defender who plays for Karpaty Lviv.

Career
Pryimak moved to Ivano-Frankivsk at the age of 6 and is a product of the Youth sportive school Prykarpattia Ivano-Frankivsk. His first trainer was Ihor Hohil.

He spent his career as player in the amateur and Ukrainian Second League levels and in December 2017 Pryimak signed a contract with the Ukrainian Premier League team NK Veres Rivne.

References

External links
 
 

1996 births
Living people
Sportspeople from Simferopol
Ukrainian footballers
Association football defenders
FC Prykarpattia Ivano-Frankivsk (1998) players
NK Veres Rivne players
FC Lviv players
FC Volyn Lutsk players
FC Karpaty Lviv players
Ukrainian Premier League players
Ukrainian First League players
Ukrainian Second League players